Singapore Polytechnic (SP) is a post-secondary education institution and statutory board under the purview of the Ministry of Education in Singapore. 

Established in 1954, SP is the first and oldest polytechnic in Singapore, and is renowned for its engineering programmes.

Organisation
Singapore Polytechnic offers full-time diploma courses and a range of continuing education programmes. It has 11 academic schools:

 School of Architecture and the Built Environment (ABE)
 SP Business School (SB)
 School of Chemical and Life Sciences (CLS)
 School of Computing (SoC)
 School of Electrical and Electronic Engineering (EEE)
 School of Life Skills and Communication (LSC)
 School of Mechanical and Aeronautical Engineering (MAE)
 School of Mathematics and Science (MS)
 Professional & Adult Continuing Education (PACE) Academy
 Media, Arts and Design School (MAD)
 Singapore Maritime Academy (SMA)

The Professional & Adult Continuing Education Academy, also known as the PACE Academy, is a multidisciplinary Continuing Education and Training (CET) Academy offering CET programmes for adults, both online and classroom based.

Facilities
The Sports Complex has a football pitch, running track, Olympic-sized swimming complex, four tennis courts, three badminton courts, three basketball courts and a gym.

The SPorts ARena, completed in 2015, has 12 badminton courts, two basketball courts, four squash courts, one multi-purpose court and two volleyball courts. Other facilities include an external rock climbing wall and two rooftop basketball courts.

Moberly is the oldest block of Singapore Polytechnic—it was once a British Army barracks, the building has been refurbished into a recreational hub. It has seven pool tables, jamming studios, karaoke rooms, a café and a mini museum.

Other facilities
 The alumni clubhouse, Singapore Polytechnic Graduates Guild (SPGG), located next to the campus, and has a bowling alley, swimming pool, pool room, a gym and a restaurant.
 Two libraries: the Main Library and Hilltop Library. The Main Library houses the first Makerspace in a Singapore library.
 AeroHub: A four-storey building that houses an aircraft hangar, laboratories and a Research & Development centre. There are currently four aircraft in the hangar: Hawker HS 125-700A, King Air B90, A4SU Super Skyhawk and Bell UH-1H.

Recognition
Singapore Polytechnic has been awarded the Singapore Quality Class as well as the ISO 9001 and ISO 14001 certifications. It has also won the Singapore Public Service Award for Organisational Excellence and the People Developer and Family Friendly Awards.

SP received the President's Award for the Environment in 2010. Some of the key green initiatives by SP over the years included spearheading the adoption of Marina Reservoir—keeping it clean and organising the Singapore International Water Festival to engage youths on environmental and water issues.

In 2011, SP won the South West Environment and Community Award (Community Category). The award recognises exemplar efforts of organisations that have contributed to environmental and community sustainability in the district.

SP also clinched the inaugural ASEAN People's Award in 2015 for its contributions toward the region's community-building efforts.

Scholarships
Singapore Polytechnic currently offers the following scholarships:
 SP Scholarship
 SP Engineering Scholarship
 SP Sports and Arts Scholarship

Singapore Polytechnic Outstanding Talent (SPOT) Programme
SPOT is a talent development and enrichment programme. All recipients of the SP Scholarship will automatically be placed under this programme. Other eligible students will be invited to join SPOT based on their academic results or lecturers' recommendation.

Admission

Early Admissions Exercise (EAE)
EAE is an admissions exercise that allows students to apply and receive conditional offers for admission to polytechnic based on their aptitudes and interests before taking their O-Level exams, or after completing their NITEC or Higher NITEC course at the Institute of Technical Education (ITE). This exercise replaced the Direct Polytechnic Admissions (DPA) and Joint Admission Exercise (JAE).

Polytechnic Foundation Programme (PFP)
PFP is an admissions exercise that allows the top 10% of Normal Academic (NA) students to apply to a polytechnic without going through O-Level. PFP students will go through a one-year course, teaching them the foundations of subjects that will be needed in their diploma year. If the student passes PFP, they will move onto their diploma courses. Additional scholarships and awards are available to those who do well in their foundation year.

Incidents

Fire at T11C in 2015
On 25 August 2015 morning at around 10:30am, a fire broke out at one of Singapore Polytechnic's building, Block T11C. About 50 students was evacuated, and 3 security officers who suffered from smoke inhalation, were taken to National University Hospital. The fire reportedly involves a solar car model according to the Singapore Civil Defence Force (SCDF).

Notable alumni

Academia
 Shih Choon Fong, college administrator
 Chai Keong Toh, computer scientist, engineer and professor

Entertainment
 Tanya Chua, singer
 Taufik Batisah, singer and Singapore Idol winner 
 Kelly Poon, singer
 Shigga Shay, Hip hop artist and songwriter
 Jarrell Huang, singer and  SPOP Sing! winner

Politics
 Cedric Foo, Minister of State for Defence (2002–2005), Minister of State for National Development (2004–2005), and Member of Parliament for West Coast GRC (2001–2011), and Pioneer SMC (2011–2020)
 Liang Eng Hwa, Member of Parliament for Bukit Panjang SMC (2020–present), and Holland–Bukit Timah GRC (2006–2020)  
 Faisal Manap, Member of Parliament for Aljunied GRC (2011–present)

References

External links
Singapore Polytechnic
Singapore Polytechnic Graduates' Guild

Polytechnics in Singapore
Statutory boards of the Singapore Government
Educational institutions established in 1954
Education in Singapore
Queenstown, Singapore
Dover, Singapore
Singapore Polytechnic alumni
1954 establishments in Singapore